Diego César Santilli (born 6 April 1967) is an Argentine accountant and politician. A member of Republican Proposal (PRO), Santilli has served in a number of posts in the Buenos Aires city government, most notably as Deputy Deputy Chief of Government (deputy mayor) under Horacio Rodríguez Larreta from 2015 to 2021.

Personal life

Diego César Santilli was born in the neighborhood of Palermo, Buenos Aires on April 6, 1967. He is son of the former president of River Plate and Banco Nación, Hugo Santilli.

He attended Saint Augustine School and received his degree in accountancy at the age of 23 from the Faculty of Economic Sciences at the University of Buenos Aires; he also pursued marketing studies at the University of California, Berkeley.

He was married to journalist Nancy Pazos, with whom he has three children.

Political career

Diego Santilli has held several public offices in Buenos Aires City, the most important being manager of the Buenos Aires City Bank and vice president of the City Legislature. From 2009 to 2013 he served as Minister of Environment and Public Spaces of the City of Buenos Aires. He is coordinator of Asociación Buenos Aires en RED and, together with his wife, founder of CANI (Food Culture for an Intelligent, Responsible and Safe Nutrition). In 2008 he wrote a children's book in order to raise awareness about the importance of following traffic norms.

In 2013, he was elected National Senator for the City of Buenos Aires; he was second in Republican Proposal's list, under Gabriela Michetti. Both Michetti and Santilli went on to leave the Senate to assume office in executive branches before the end of their term.

In 2021, he ran for a seat in the Chamber of Deputies in the Juntos por el Cambio list in Buenos Aires Province.

References 

Público y Eficiente (Public and Efficient)

External links 
 Official Blog
 Official Website

1967 births
Living people
Argentine people of Italian descent
Republican Proposal politicians
Politicians from Buenos Aires
Members of the Argentine Senate for Buenos Aires
Members of the Argentine Chamber of Deputies elected in Buenos Aires Province
Deputy Chiefs of Government of Buenos Aires